The list of ship commissionings in 1972 includes a chronological list of all ships commissioned in 1972.


See also 

1972